Tropic is a town in Garfield County, Utah, United States, along Utah Scenic Byway 12. As of the 2010 census, the town had a population of 530. Tropic was founded in 1891.

Geography 
It is in the Tropic Valley, drained by the Paria River, a tributary of the Colorado River.

Demographics 

As of the census of 2000, there were 508 people in the town, organized into 160 households and 132 families. The population density was 60.6 people per square mile (23.4/km2). There were 206 housing units at an average density of 24.6 per square mile (9.5/km2). The racial makeup of the town was 96.06% White, 0.39% Native American, 1.38% from other races, and 2.17% from two or more races. There were no African Americans, Asians, or Pacific Islanders. 2.36% of the population were Hispanic or Latino of any race.

There were 160 households, out of which 41.9% had children under 18 living with them, 73.8% were married couples living together, 5.6% had a female householder with no husband present, and 16.9% were non-families. 13.8% of all households were made up of individuals, and 8.1% had someone who was 65 years of age or older living alone. The average household size was 3.18, and the average family size was 3.52.

The town's population was spread out, with 34.6% under 18, 7.5% from 18 to 24, 22.0% from 25 to 44, 21.7% from 45 to 64, and 14.2% who were 65 years of age or older. The median age was 32 years. For every 100 females, there were 100 males. For every 100 females aged 18 and over, there were 91.9 males.

The median income for a household in the town was $42,500, and the median income for a family was $44,125. Males had a median income of $32,500 versus $22,222 for females. The per capita income for the town was $13,896. 2.1% of the population and 3.0% of families were below the poverty line. Out of the total population, 1.0% of those under 18 and 10.0% of those 65 and older lived below the poverty line.

Notable people
Wanda Day, drummer of the rock band 4 Non Blondes. Day died on July 10, 1997 at age 36 and is buried in the Tropic cemetery.

See also
 
 List of cities and towns in Utah

References

External links

Town of Tropic official website

Populated places established in 1891
Towns in Garfield County, Utah
Towns in Utah
1891 establishments in Utah Territory